Georg Heibl (born 16 February 1935) is a West German bobsledder who competed in the 1970s. He won two silver medals in the two-man event at the FIBT World Championships, earning them in 1974 and 1975.

Heibl also finished fifth in the four-man event at the 1976 Winter Olympics in Innsbruck.

References

External links
Bobsleigh two-man world championship medalists since 1931
Wallenchinsky, David (1984). "Bobsled: Four-man". In The Complete Book of the Winter Olympics: 1896 - 1980. New York: Penguin Books. pp. 561.

1935 births
Living people
Bobsledders at the 1976 Winter Olympics
German male bobsledders
Olympic bobsledders of West Germany
20th-century German people